Gareth Jonathan Howells (born 13 June 1970) is an English former footballer who played in the Football League for Torquay United.

References

1970 births
Living people
English footballers
Association football goalkeepers
English Football League players
People from Guildford
Tottenham Hotspur F.C. players
Swindon Town F.C. players
Leyton Orient F.C. players
Enfield F.C. players
Torquay United F.C. players
Farnborough F.C. players
Kettering Town F.C. players
Hellenic F.C. players
Dorking F.C. players
St Albans City F.C. players
Boreham Wood F.C. players
Sutton United F.C. players
Aldershot Town F.C. players
Maidenhead United F.C. players
Havant & Waterlooville F.C. players